The Traun is a river in Upper Bavaria, Germany. It is formed by the confluence of the Weiße Traun (also considered its upper course) and the Rote Traun near Siegsdorf. It passes through Traunstein and Traunreut, and flows into the Alz near Altenmarkt an der Alz.

See also 
List of rivers of Bavaria

References 

Rivers of Bavaria
Rivers of Germany